Menggenjimisu or, in Mongolian, Mönggönjimis (Mongolian script: , pronunciation: // 'silver fruit') is a Paralympian athlete of short stature from China competing in category F40 shot put and discus events. Menggenjimisu won a gold medal at the 2008 Summer Paralympics F40 Discus competing under the name Jimisu Menggen. At the London Paralympics she was billed as Genjimisu Meng.

Life
Menggenjimisu was born in Ordos in Inner Mongolia on 8 April 1991 in a yurt. Her mother abandoned her because she was of small stature and Menggenjimisu was brought up by her grandmother as her father also had a disability. Menggenjimisu's family were poor but they still managed to send her to school. Menggenjimisu did well at her studies and still found time to look after the family's herd in her spare time. Her ability to withstand a hard life drew the attention of Hasilao in 2005.  Hasilao, who had won a medal in Atlanta in 1996, and who was planning to compete himself in his fourth Paralympics in Beijing, had set up a training camp for ten athletes in Ordos.
Menggenjimisu had to approach her grandparents twice before they consented to let her leave to train. They surrendered to the request because they knew that Menggenjimisu would be fed well, educated and accommodated in her new life.

After training with her coach, Shen Gang, Menggenjimisu was chosen to represent China at the 2008 Beijing Paralympic Games after doing well in National competitions. She competed at the Bird's Nest Stadium in Beijing, China in September, 2008.
There she won a gold medal in the F40 discus and a silver medal in the women's F40 shot put event. She defeated  Tunisian Raoua Tlili to capture gold in discus in a performance where both made world record throws. Menggenjimisu made the longest world record throw of 28.04 metres. Menggenjimisu said this was her most memorable achievement.

Menggenjimisu went on to compete in the F40 shot put at the 2008 Paralympics under the name Menggen Jimisu, winning a silver medal after making a throw of 8.48 meters. Menggenjimisu was beaten to the gold by Raoua Tlili on 15 September in a reversal of the earlier positions. Raoua Tlili established a new World Record of 8.95 to beat Menggenjimisu.

In 2010, she competed at the Paralympic World Cup under the name Meng Genjimisu where she was second in the shot put (again to Tlili of Tunisia).

In the 2012 Paralympics in London, Menggenjimisu won a bronze in the discus, beaten into third place by the Tunisian Raoua Tlili and Najat El Garaa of Morocco.

Honours
Apart from Menggenjimisu's medals she has also been honoured with carrying the torch before the 8th National Para Games in Hangzhou in 2011. She has also won the May Day Labour Medal and the 4 May Youth medal.

References

External links
 

Chinese people of Mongolian descent
People from Ordos City
Sportspeople from Inner Mongolia
Paralympic athletes of China
Athletes (track and field) at the 2012 Summer Paralympics
Athletes (track and field) at the 2008 Summer Paralympics
Paralympic gold medalists for China
Paralympic silver medalists for China
Living people
Chinese female discus throwers
1991 births
Paralympic bronze medalists for China
Chinese female shot putters
Competitors in athletics with dwarfism
Medalists at the 2008 Summer Paralympics
Medalists at the 2012 Summer Paralympics
Paralympic medalists in athletics (track and field)